Paloue is a genus of flowering plants in the family Fabaceae. It belongs to the subfamily Detarioideae. The genera was first created with the description of Paloue guianensis by Aublet in 1775.

Description 
Paloue are large, woody trees, with simple leaves. The flowers of Paloue species have five petals and nine fertile stamens.

Distribution and Habitat 
All species of Paloue are found in northern South America. More specifically, they are endemic to the Guiana Shield.

Species 

 Paloue bicolor (Ducke) Redden
 P. brasiliensis Ducke, 1915
 P. coccinea (R. H. Schomb. ex Benth.) Redden
 P. duckei (Huber) Redden
 P. durissima (Ducke) Redden
 P. emarginata (R. S. Cowan) Redden
 P. fanshawei (R. S. Cowan) Redden
 P. guianensis Aublet, 1775 
 P. induta Sandwith, 1937
 P. leiogyne (Ducke) Redden
 P. macrostachya (Benth.) Redden
 P. paraensis (Ducke) Redden
 P. princeps (R. H. Schomb. ex Benth.) Redden
 P. riparia Pulle, 1906
 P. sandwithii Redden, 2008
 P. speciosa (Ducke) Redden

References 

Detarioideae
Fabaceae genera